The Ngong Ping Terminal is a terminal station of the gondola lift known as Ngong Ping 360, located on Lantau Island's Ngong Ping, in Hong Kong. It was opened on 18 September 2006.

References

External links
 

 

Ngong Ping
Transport in Hong Kong